The 2019 Lyon Open (also known as the Open Parc Auvergne-Rhône-Alpes Lyon) was a men's tennis tournament played on outdoor clay courts. It was the third edition of the Lyon Open and part of the ATP Tour 250 series of the 2019 ATP Tour. It took place in the city of Lyon, France, from 19 May through 25 May 2019. Unseeded Benoît Paire won the singles title.

Singles main draw entrants

Seeds 

 Rankings are as of May 13, 2019.

Other entrants 
The following players received wildcards into the singles main draw:
  Richard Gasquet
  Corentin Moutet
  Denis Shapovalov

The following player received entry using a protected ranking into the singles main draw:
  Jo-Wilfried Tsonga

The following players received entry from the qualifying draw:
  Steven Diez
  Maxime Janvier
  Jannik Sinner
  Jiří Veselý

The following players received entry as lucky losers:
  Lloyd Harris
  Tristan Lamasine

Withdrawals 
Before the tournament
 Tomáš Berdych → replaced by  Benoît Paire
 John Isner → replaced by  Pablo Andújar
 Martin Kližan → replaced by  Lloyd Harris
 Mikhail Kukushkin → replaced by  Tristan Lamasine
 Jan-Lennard Struff → replaced by  Ugo Humbert
During the tournament
 Richard Gasquet

Retirements 
 Bernard Tomic

Doubles main draw entrants

Seeds

 Rankings are as of May 13, 2019.

Other entrants
The following pairs received wildcards into the doubles main draw:
  Antoine Hoang /  Grégoire Jacq 
  Ugo Humbert /  Tristan Lamasine

The following pairs received entry as alternates:
  Romain Arneodo /  Hugo Nys
  Gong Maoxin /  Lloyd Harris

Withdrawals
Before the tournament
  Martin Kližan
  Cameron Norrie
During the tournament
  Michael Venus

Finals

Singles

  Benoît Paire defeated  Félix Auger-Aliassime, 6–4, 6–3

Doubles

 Ivan Dodig /  Édouard Roger-Vasselin defeated  Ken Skupski /  Neal Skupski, 6–4, 6–3

References

2019
2019 ATP Tour
2019 in French tennis
May 2019 sports events in France